Sevettijärvi (and ) is a village in the municipality of Inari, Finland approximately  north of downtown Inari. The village's green, yet stark terrain opens up as Neiden approaches.

The village is built on what used to be the sea floor during the Ice Age. The rocky shores of the lakes between Sevettijärvi and Neiden draw the attention of passers-by. These shores are referred to as the “devil’s fields” by locals.

Sevettijärvi and its surrounding areas are one of the main areas where the Skolts live. The majority of Sevettijärvi's 350 residents, approximately 90%, are Skolt, although there are a few Finns who have moved north living in the village. A few Inari and Northern Sámi and some foreigners (French, Dutch) also live in the area.

History 

Sevettijärvi was founded when a total of 51 Skolt families were evacuated there from Petsamo after the wars in 1949. Before that, a few Sámi families had been living in the area, e.g., the Aikios, Kittis, Sarris, Holmbergs, Högmans and Kaarrettis.

At the same time, a school, a health centre and a chapel were built. A merchant from Inari built a shop in the center of the village.

The first road passable by car to Sevettijärvi was built at the end of the 1960s. Prior to that, people used Bombardier snowmobiles, reindeer and skis to get around in winter and walked, biked or went by boat in the summertime.

Sites 

The village has an old Skolt cottage, which was moved to Sevettijärvi from Kirakkajärvi and currently serves as a museum dedicated to the traditions of the Skolts. In addition, it has an Orthodox church that previously served as the parish's chapel.

A suspension bridge hangs over the Näätämö River at Lake Opukas, an approximately  hike from Sevettijärvi.

Notable people
Veikko Feodoroff, member of the Sami Parliament (Finland)

See also
Sevetti moraine

References

External links 

Villages in Inari, Finland